The Polka Italienne (Italian Polka) is a piano work for two pianos by Sergei Rachmaninoff. It was composed in 1906. The piece begins in the key of E-flat minor then changes to E-flat major during the middle section.

References

External links 
 

Compositions for two pianos
1906 compositions
Piano music by Sergei Rachmaninoff
Compositions in E-flat minor
Chamber music by Sergei Rachmaninoff